Beniquez Jacoi Brown (born April 29, 1993) is an American football linebacker who is currently a free agent. He played college football at Mississippi State. He was signed by the Green Bay Packers as an undrafted free agent in 2016, and later played for the Birmingham Iron of the Alliance of American Football and the Houston Roughnecks of the XFL.

College career
Brown attended Mississippi State University, where he played for coach Dan Mullen's Mississippi State Bulldogs football team from 2012 to 2015.

Statistics
Source: HailState.com

Professional career

After going undrafted in the 2016 NFL Draft, Brown signed with the Green Bay Packers on May 6, 2016. On September 3, 2016, he was released by the Packers during final team cuts. Brown was signed to the Packers' practice squad on September 5, 2016. He was released from the practice squad two days later.

In 2018, Brown signed with the Birmingham Iron of the AAF for the 2019 season. The league ceased operations in April 2019.

On October 15, 2019, Brown was drafted in the 6th round during phase three in the 2020 XFL Draft by the Houston Roughnecks. He had his contract terminated when the league suspended operations on April 10, 2020.

On February 23, 2022 he was selected by the Houston Gamblers in round 21 of the  USFL draft.

References

External links
 Green Bay Packers bio
 Mississippi State Bulldogs bio

Further reading

1993 births
Living people
Players of American football from Alabama
Sportspeople from Florence, Alabama
American football linebackers
Mississippi State Bulldogs football players
Green Bay Packers players
Birmingham Iron players
Houston Roughnecks players
Houston Gamblers (2022) players